16 Biggest Hits is a 1999 Roy Orbison compilation album. It is part of a series of similar 16 Biggest Hits albums released by Legacy Recordings.

The album was certified Gold in 2005 by the RIAA. It has sold 830,000 copies in the US as of May 2013.

Track listing
"Only the Lonely" (Roy Orbison, Joe Melson) – 2:26
"Blue Angel" (Orbison, Melson) – 2:51
"I'm Hurtin'" (Orbison, Melson) – 2:42
"Running Scared" (Orbison, Melson) – 2:12
"Crying" (Orbison, Melson) – 2:46
"Candy Man" (Fred Neil, Beverly Ross) – 2:45
"Dream Baby (How Long Must I Dream)" (Cindy Walker) – 2:33
"The Crowd" (Orbison, Melson) – 2:24
"Leah" (Orbison) – 2:40
"Workin' for the Man" (Orbison) – 2:20
"In Dreams" (Orbison) – 2:49
"Falling" (Orbison) – 2:23
"Mean Woman Blues" (Claude Demetrius) – 2:25
"Blue Bayou" (Orbison, Melson) – 2:31
"It's Over" (Orbison, Bill Dees) – 2:48
"Oh, Pretty Woman" (Orbison, Dees) – 2:57

Chart performance
16 Biggest Hits peaked at #47 on the U.S. Billboard Top Country Albums chart the week of February 10, 2001.

Certifications

References

Orbison, Roy
Roy Orbison compilation albums
1999 greatest hits albums